Forelius damiani  is a species of ant in the genus Forelius. It was discovered and described by Guerrero, R. J. & Fernandez, F. in 2008.

References

External links

Dolichoderinae
Insects described in 2008